The Adair County Courthouse in Columbia, Kentucky, a courthouse at 500 Public Sq., was built in 1885.  It was listed on the National Register of Historic Places in 1974.

It was designed by McDonald Brothers.  It was built by William Henry Hudson, "who was so proud of
his work that he had his portrait carved in a capital on the porch."

It has a four-sided clock tower.  It was deemed " one of the best preserved of major late 19th-century Kentucky courthouses."

References

Courthouses on the National Register of Historic Places in Kentucky
Gothic Revival architecture in Kentucky
Government buildings completed in 1885
National Register of Historic Places in Adair County, Kentucky
Courthouses in Kentucky
1885 establishments in Kentucky
Columbia, Kentucky